Taranis tanata is a species of sea snail, a marine gastropod mollusk in the family Raphitomidae.

Description
The length of the shell attains .

Distribution
This marine species is endemic to Southeast Brazil.

References

External links
 Figueira, R. M. A.; Absalão, R. S. (2010). Deep-water Mangeliinae, Taraninae and Clathurellinae (Mollusca: Gastropoda: Conoidea: Turridae) from the Campos Basin, southeast Brazil. Scientia Marina. 74(4): 731-743

tanata
Gastropods described in 2010